Riverwood is a suburb in southern Sydney, in the state of New South Wales, Australia. Riverwood is located 19 kilometres south of the Sydney central business district and is part of the St George area. Riverwood is split between the local government areas of the Georges River Council and the City of Canterbury-Bankstown.

History

When the East Hills railway line came through the area in 1931, the station was called Herne Bay. The area was subdivided in 1919 and redeveloped in 1942 during World War 2, when the Government of Australia and the Allied Works Council establish an army base hospital barracks for the United States Army, the 118 General Hospital. The hospital was built at a cost of one-million pounds and consisted of 490 barrack type buildings containing approximately four-thousand-two-hundred and fifty beds. The hospital was staffed by doctors and nurses from The Johns Hopkins University Hospital in Baltimore, Maryland.

The Americans, who at the time, were using the Hydro Majestic Hotel in Medlow Bath as a hospital, relocated and moved into the first section of the Herne Bay premises in May 1943. By November, 1700 beds were being utilised. The site was visited by General MacArthur, First Lady Mrs Eleanor Roosevelt, Artie Shaw's Band and Bob Hope.
In October 1944 the main US hospital left for the liberation of the Philippines, although some American patients and staff remained on site until January 1945. In that same month, the Royal Navy (United Kingdom) opened a hospital to treat wounded members of the British Pacific Fleet in the vacated buildings. It received and treated 9003 patients. The Australian army occupied some of the other sections. One of the sections in use was located in Cullens Road, between Canterbury Road and Wiggs Roads Punchbowl and used up until March 1947.
After the war the military departed, and the hospital barrack buildings of timber and corrugated iron (some of which still survive today) were handed over to the Housing Commission from March 1946 and converted into public housing to relieve housing shortages. Some of the street names recall the American presence such as Pennsylvania Road, Kentucky Road, Wyoming Place, Idaho Place, Michigan Road, Montana Crescent, Roosevelt Avenue and Truman Avenue. Now the Herne Bay Hospital is the headquarters for the Australian Air League Riverwood Squadron.

The suburb developed an unsavoury reputation for poverty, overcrowding and violence, and its name was changed to Riverwood in 1957, in large part to remove the stigma associated with living there. This helped to change the reputation of the area. From the 1950s onwards, purpose-built utilitarian public housing apartment blocks and freestanding bungalows replaced most of the former military buildings on the northern side of the railway line, while the southern part of the suburb was mostly privately developed.

Population
In the 2016 Census, there were 12,103 people in Riverwood. 39.7% of people were born in Australia. The next most common places of birth were Mainland China 18.6%, Lebanon 2.9%, Hong Kong S.A.R 2.8%, Vietnam 2.3% and New Zealand 2.2%. 31.8% of people only spoke English at home. Other languages spoken at home included Mandarin 15.3%, Cantonese 12.5%, Arabic 8.5%, Greek 2.8% and Vietnamese 2.7%. The most common responses for religion were No Religion 28.1%, Catholic 19.9% and Islam 9.4%.
Nepalese 0.2%

Commercial area

The main shopping centre is located on Belmore Road and Thurlow Streets, near Riverwood railway station. Riverwood Plaza is a small shopping centre on Belmore Road that features Woolworths and ALDI supermarkets, liquor retailer BWS, a post office, specialty shops and a food court.

A strip of on-street businesses line Belmore Road on both the northern and southern sides of Riverwood railway station.

Transport
Riverwood railway station is on the Airport & South Line of the Sydney Trains network, with Padstow to the west and Narwee to the east.

Although the buses of Punchbowl Bus Company are stabled at their headquarters on Hannans Road Riverwood, the suburb itself does not act as a bus terminus. For details of bus routes see Riverwood Station

The M5 South Western Motorway crosses Belmore Road in Riverwood, offering on- and off-ramps for northeast-bound and southwest-bound traffic.

Landmarks
 Riverwood Library, Kentucky Road
 Riverwood Community Centre, Belmore Road
 Club Rivers
 Australian Air League Riverwood Squadron Hall, Former US Army Hospital Building
 Riverwood Skate Park
 Punchbowl Bus Company
 Riverwood Plaza
 Morris Iemma Indoor Sports Centre

References

External links

 Canterbury City Council's historical information on Riverwoord.

City of Canterbury-Bankstown
Georges River Council